Mary Elizabeth Lange, OSP (born Elizabeth Clarisse Lange; c. 1789 – February 3, 1882) was a Black Catholic religious sister who founded the Oblate Sisters of Providence, the first African-American religious congregation. She was also, via the Oblates, the first-ever African-American superior general.

Her cause for her beatification was opened in 1991 and she is honored as a Servant of God.

Life

Early life
Lange was born in San Domingo about 1789. It is said that her mother, Annette Lange, was the daughter of a Jewish plantation owner, and that her father Clovis was a mulatto slave on the same plantation.

During the Haitian Revolution her family fled to Santiago de Cuba. There she received an excellent education. She left Cuba in the early 1800s and immigrated to the United States. The Oblates' oral tradition says she arrived first in Charleston, South Carolina, then traveled to Norfolk, Virginia, and finally settled in Baltimore, Maryland by 1813.  Baltimore's free African-American population had already outnumbered the city's slave population. A fair-sized French-speaking Afro-Caribbean population had earlier fled the revolution in Haiti.

In the early 1800s, various Protestant organizations in Baltimore such as Sharp Street Methodist Episcopal Church’s Free African School (1802), Daniel Coker’s Bethel Charity School (c. 1812), St. James Protestant Episcopal Day School (1824), and William Lively’s Union Seminary (1825) created schools for African-American students. While providing a valuable service, they could not meet the demands of Baltimore’s growing free African-American population. Lange recognized the need for education for African American children and opened a school for them in her home in the Fells Point area of the city. There were no free public schools for Black children in Baltimore until 1866.

Foundress
In Baltimore, Lange met a Sulpician priest James Nicholas Joubert, who was a native of France and a former soldier. Joubert had also fled the rebellion in Haiti. He was in charge of teaching catechism to the African American children who attended the Lower Chapel at Saint Mary's Seminary. He found they had difficulty learning the catechism because they could not read very well and thought it would be good to start a school for girls. After getting permission from the Archbishop, he began looking for two women of color to serve as teachers. A friend suggested Elizabeth Lange and Marie Balas since they were already operating a school in their home. He then decided it a good idea to start a women's religious order at the same time, to teach the children and asked the women if they would do so. They shared with him that they felt called to consecrate their lives to God and had been waiting for Him to show them a way to serve Him.  Joubert agreed to support them and persuaded Archbishop James Whitfield to approve the new community. Thus the Oblate Sisters of Providence were founded by Lange and Joubert as the first religious congregation of women of African descent in the United States. The Oblate Sisters of Providence were established with the primary purpose of the Catholic education of girls.

On July 2, 1829, Lange and three other women (Rosanne Boegue, Marie Balas, and an older student, Almaide Duchemin) took their first vows. Lange took the name of "Sister Mary" and became the first superior general of the new community. The sisters adopted a religious habit of a black dress and cape with a white cap. They started in a rented house with four sisters and twenty students. The school later became known as St. Frances Academy, and is still in operation today in Baltimore. While experiencing poverty, racism, and untold hardships, the Oblate Sisters sought to evangelize the Black community through Catholic education. In addition to schools, the sisters later conducted night classes for women, vocational and career training, and established homes for widows and orphans.

By 1832, the community had grown to eleven members when a cholera outbreak hit the city. While the community as a whole volunteered to risk their lives in nursing the victims of this plague, only four were chosen, Lange herself and three companions.

In the mid-1840s, when Sister Frances died, Lange took her place working as a domestic at St. Mary’s Seminary in the city to help support her community. In 1850 she was appointed to serve the congregation as Mistress of novices, a position in which she served for the next ten years.

Lange died on February 3, 1882, and was buried in the Cathedral Cemetery. Her remains were transferred to New Cathedral Cemetery on February 6, 1882. On May 28, 2013, Mother Mary Lange was exhumed and transferred to the home of the Oblate Sisters of Providence, where she was laid to rest in their chapel.

Legacy

Lange's legacy has thrived over the years in the United States and in several foreign countries.

Lange was inducted into the Maryland Women's Hall of Fame in 1991 for the school she founded.

In 2005, three Baltimore parochial schools (St. Dominic School, Shrine of the Little Flower, and St. Anthony of Padua) were combined into Mother Mary Lange Catholic School, thus becoming the first school named after her in America.

The 180th anniversary of St. Frances Academy was celebrated in 2008.

A new Mother Mary Lange Catholic School was opened in August 2021, the first new Catholic school in Baltimore in nearly six decades, with Alisha Jordan as the founding principal.

Veneration
After her death, many Catholics in Baltimore began to venerate her as a saint.

In 1991, with the approval of the Holy See, Cardinal William Henry Keeler, Archbishop of Baltimore, officially opened a formal investigation of Lange's life to study it for her possible canonization. As part of this process, she was titled "Servant of God" and her remains were exhumed and examined. They were then moved to the chapel of Our Lady of Mount Providence Convent, the motherhouse of the congregation.

In 2004, documents describing Lange's life were sent to the Vatican's Congregation for the Causes of Saints. Dr. Waldery Hilgeman was the postulator of the cause.

References

External links
 National Black Catholic Congress bio & story
Mother Lange’s relics moved to motherhouse as sainthood cause advances

1789 births
1882 deaths
Haitian emigrants to the United States
Religious leaders from Baltimore
African-American schoolteachers
Schoolteachers from Maryland
19th-century American women educators
Haitian Roman Catholics
Founders of Catholic religious communities
American Servants of God
African-American Roman Catholic religious sisters and nuns
19th-century American educators
Venerated African-American Catholics
African-American Catholic superiors general
Oblate Sisters of Providence